The Keg is a Canadian-owned chain of steakhouse restaurants and bars located in Canada and the United States. The original "The Keg and Cleaver" restaurant was founded by George Tidball, in 1971, at a location in North Vancouver, British Columbia. By February 2018, The Keg had expanded to 160 locations in Canada and the United States, when Canadian food industry giant Cara Operations (now known as Recipe Unlimited) purchased the chain for $200 million, from then owners David Aisenstat (49%) and Fairfax Financial (51%). Aisenstat had been the sole owner from 1997 until 2014.

History

It was founded in 1971 in North Vancouver, British Columbia as The Keg 'n Cleaver by George Tidball at one very small, downstairs location in an old industrial building in the Moodyville area of lower Lonsdale and today operates in nine provinces (excluding only Prince Edward Island) and five American states.

The Keg is well known for buying up historic properties, refurbishing them and turning them into restaurants. Examples of this are the Keg Mansion in Toronto, and the Keg Manor at the Maplelawn Estate in Ottawa. Also notable as heritage restorations are the Kegs in Kamloops, British Columbia, which was a CN Station and in New Westminster, British Columbia, which was formerly the city's CPR station.  The Old Strathcona location, restored and opened in Edmonton, Alberta just three years after Tidball opened the first Keg, was built in 1912 as the Scona Apartments and Scona Garage, one of the earliest automobile sales and service locations in that city. This location has since closed.

Operations

Financial and physical operations have been managed by David Aisenstat for a number of years. The restaurants operated as Keg Restaurants Ltd. (KRL), with Aisenstat involved in selling to the British firm Whitbread PLC in 1987.  In 1997, Aisenstat arranged financing a purchased 100% of KRL back from Whitbread.

The Fund owns the trademarks & intellectual property of "The Keg", and receives an annual royalty in the amount of 4% of gross sales for restaurant locations in the Royalty Pool. KRL kept a 99-year license to use "The Keg" as the name of the restaurants. KRL also provided management services to The Keg Royalties Income Fund at no cost as part of its long-term royalty and licensing agreement. The creation of The Keg Royalties Income Fund presented the first opportunity for the public to trade in any portion of The Keg group of companies, which had been fully private until that time.

On February 4, 2014, Aisenstat sold 51% of his private holdings in The Keg to Fairfax Financial, a publicly traded Canadian holding company. The transaction also introduced another indirect way for the public to invest in The Keg, by investing in Fairfax Financial.

On January 23, 2018, it was announced that Canadian food industry giant Cara Operations was purchasing KRL for $200 million. The deal closed in February 2018, with Fairfax Financial and David Aisenstat sharing $105 million plus 3.8 million Cara subordinate voting shares. Aisenstat joined the Board of Directors of Cara, and assumed executive oversight of the higher-end brands within the 19 different restaurant chains then held by Cara. Cara also announced that the acquisition had prompted the company to change its own name, confirming on May 10, 2018, that Cara Operations would be renamed Recipe Unlimited Corporation.

See also
List of Canadian restaurant chains

References

External links

Recipe Unlimited
Companies based in Richmond, British Columbia
Restaurant chains in Canada
Economy of the Western United States
Regional restaurant chains in the United States
Companies listed on the Toronto Stock Exchange
Steakhouses
Restaurants established in 1972
1972 establishments in British Columbia
2018 mergers and acquisitions